Menachem Elimelech is the Sterling Professor of Environmental and Chemical Engineering at Yale University. In 1998, he founded Yale's Environmental Engineering program. The program rose to international prominence and has been ranked in the top 10 of the U.S. News & World Report’s Graduate Engineering Rankings for the past six years. 

Elimelech specializes in problems involving physicochemical, colloidal, and microbial processes in engineered and natural environmental systems.

In 2006, Elimelech was elected a member of the National Academy of Engineering for contributions to the theory and practice of advanced filtration technologies for the treatment and reuse of potable water.

Biography
Elimelech graduated summa cum laude from the Hebrew University of Jerusalem with B.S. and M.S. degrees in 1983 and 1985, respectively.  He earned his Ph.D. in environmental engineering at Johns Hopkins University in 1989 under the direction of Charles R. O’Melia.  His dissertation was titled “The Effect of Particles Size on the Kinetics of Deposition of Brownian Particles in Porous Media.”

Elimelech was professor and vice chair of the Department of Civil and Environmental Engineering at UCLA. He moved to Yale University in 1998, he founded Yale's Environmental Engineering Program.

Major awards
  W.M. Keck Foundation Engineering Teaching Excellence Award (1994)
 Yale University Graduate Mentoring Award (2004)
 Athalie Richardson Irvine Clarke Prize (2005) 
 Election to the National Academy of Engineering (2006)
 Yale University Postdoctoral Mentoring Prize (2012)
 Eni Award (2015)
Foreign Fellow of the Australian Academy of Technology and Engineering (2021)

As an author
Professor Elimelech has authored more than 460 refereed journal publications, including invited review articles in Science and Nature, and is co-author of the book Particle Deposition and Aggregation (1995). He is a Highly Cited Researcher (Web of Science).

References

External links
The Chemical & Environmental Engineering Department at Yale
Menachem Elimelech's Faculty Page at the Yale School of Engineering & Applied Science
Elimelech Research Group Web Page

Living people
Johns Hopkins University alumni
Yale School of Engineering & Applied Science faculty
Members of the United States National Academy of Engineering
Foreign members of the Chinese Academy of Engineering
Year of birth missing (living people)
Fellows of the Association of Environmental Engineering and Science Professors